Cycas simplicipinna is a species of cycad in Vietnam, Thailand, Laos, Myanmar, and China (in Yunnan). In Thailand, it has been recorded in the provinces of Chiang Mai (type locality), Phrae, Loei, and Phetchabun.

References

simplicipinna
Flora of China
Flora of Indo-China